Iochroma fuchsioides  is an Iochroma species found in Ecuador and Colombia. It was first described in 1848. In addition to the known withanolide D {1}, three new withanolides have been isolated from Iochroma fuchsioides.

References

External links

fuchsioides
Taxa named by Aimé Bonpland
Plants described in 1848